The Hawaii Department of Transportation Harbor Police (HP) is the principal maritime law enforcement agency of the State of Hawaii, headquartered at Honolulu Harbor.  HP is unique because they are one of the few U.S. police forces dedicated exclusively, but not limited to port activities.  The Hawaii Director of Transportation appoints Harbor Enforcement Officers who are authorized to:

- Conduct any enforcement action in any commercial harbor area and any area over which the Hawaii Department of Transportation (HDOT) and the Director of Transportation has jurisdiction under Chapter 266, Hawaii Revised Statutes;

- Inspect and examine at reasonable hours any premises, and the buildings and other structures thereon, where harbors or harbor facilities are situated, or where harbor-related activities are operated or conducted; and

- Subject to limitations as may be imposed by the Director of Transportation, serve and execute warrants, arrest offenders, and serve notices and orders.

Chapter 266, Hawaii Revised Statutes, is unique because it implicitly confers the powers of police officers upon the Hawaii Director of Transportation, and any officer, employee, or representative of the department, but the Director chooses to limit those powers to appointed Harbor Enforcement Officers.

History

Little is known about law enforcement at commercial ports in Hawaii prior to 1967.  Law enforcement authority, and the authorization to appoint police officers was granted to the Director of Transportation on May 15, 1967, but has switched from state agency to agency until explicitly re-delegated to the Department of Transportation in 1996.

On July 2, 1987, police officers appointed by the Director of Transportation were granted additional authority to enforce certain conservation, resources, and historic preservation laws under the jurisdiction of the Department of Land and Natural Resources (DLNR).  Upon request by the Department of Transportation, Conservation and Resources Enforcement Officers appointed by the DLNR were authorized to enforce rules relating to public beaches and ocean waters, and those relating to the operation of vessels in state waters.

On June 7, 1989, Governor John D. Waiheʻe III signed Act 211 (1989) into law, which consolidated state law enforcement entities into a single state Department of Public Safety.

On July 1, 1991, Marine Patrol officers under the jurisdiction of the Department of Transportation were transferred to the Department of Public Safety, with the primary responsibility to enforce boating, ocean recreational and coastal area programs.

Effective July 1, 1992, police officers appointed by the Director of Transportation could focus on protecting commercial harbors in the state as the bulk of their primary responsibilities were transferred to other state agencies.  Furthermore, the Department of Transportation no longer had jurisdiction over small boat harbors, including public beaches and ocean waters.

After five years with the Department of Public Safety, the functions of the Marine Patrol were transferred to the Department of Land and Natural Resources to focus on ocean recreation and coastal area enforcement on July 1, 1996.  The Harbor Patrol, established by the Department of Public Safety, was transferred to the Department of Transportation to focus on law enforcement at commercial harbors on the same date.

On July 2, 2019, Harbor police officers were authorized to utilize electric guns while performing their duties.

Rank structure and insignia

HP follows a paramilitary like rank structure, which is identified below:

Patrol Vehicles

As of 2016, HP has transitioned to the Ford Explorer Police Interceptor as the Ford Crown Victoria is no longer in production.  However, HP continues to maintain a handful of Ford products as supplemental units.

Boats

HP maintains and operates a 27-foot, aluminum-hull vessel christened Kia`iawa, meaning "harbor guardian," which is used to patrol both Honolulu and Kalaeloa Barbers Point Harbors.  Kia`iawa was christened in 2013.

HP also utilizes the Moku Maka`i, a 21-foot Boston Whaler, in service for nearly two decades, and will be maintained as a supplemental patrol craft.

The Kia`iawa "cost approximately $390,000 which was fully provided by a federal grant."

Kia`iawa features upgraded equipment over the Moku Maka'i, including better radar, GPS and depth-finding devices.  "The vessel is also equipped with a closed-cabin and shock-absorbing seats to minimize impacts in rough water conditions."

Jurisdiction

Harbor Enforcement Officers are authorized to enforce the Hawaii Revised Statutes and the ordinances of the various counties throughout the State of Hawaii, as prescribed by law.  For example, the Statewide Traffic Code, Chapter 291C, Hawaii Revised Statutes, defines 'police officer' as: "every officer authorized to direct or regulate traffic or to make arrests for violations of traffic regulations."  HP is authorized to 'regulate traffic or to make arrests for violations of traffic regulations' pursuant to Chapters 91, 266 and 291C, Hawaii Revised Statutes.  Rules pertaining to 'traffic' on parcels subject to the jurisdiction of the department are regulated by Chapter 19-43, Hawaii Administrative Rules.

Proposed Law Enforcement Mergers

In August 2017, HDOT indicated that it was planning on merging HP and State of Hawaii Sheriff's Office deputies assigned to the Daniel K. Inouye International Airport into a single law enforcement agency controlled by the department.  In January 2018, House Bill No. 2402 and Senate Bill No. 2829 were introduced by the respective presiding officers of each chamber of the Hawaii State Legislature on behalf of the Governor of Hawaii.  The bills are identical companion measures which would have created an "Office of Law Enforcement and Security for Transportation Systems" in HDOT.  As of April 2018, the bills have not been scheduled for any legislative hearings, have failed to meet internal legislative deadlines, and are unlikely to become law.

Senate Bill No. 2909, also introduced in January 2018, initially proposed to consolidate and place HP, the State of Hawaii Sheriff's Office, the Hawaii Department of Public Safety Narcotics Enforcement Division, and the Hawaii Division of Conservation and Resource Enforcement under the jurisdiction of the Hawaii Department of the Attorney General.  On July 5, 2018, Governor David Ige signed the into bill law as Act 124, Session Laws of Hawaii 2018, which required the Hawaii Legislative Reference Bureau "to conduct a study that examines consolidating the law enforcement activities and responsibilities of various state divisions and agencies under a single, centralized state enforcement division or agency".

In January 2019, the Legislative Reference Bureau released Report No. 1, 2019 - "Joining Forces? Potential Consolidation of State Law Enforcement Duties in Hawaii".  The bureau determined that due to the "lack of clearly defined goals of a consolidation, it is not clear that a consolidation would be either desirable or beneficial."

See also

 Hawaii Department of Transportation
 Honolulu Harbor

References

State law enforcement agencies of Hawaii
Port police departments of the United States